A modeling agency is a company that represents fashion models, to work for the fashion industry. These agencies earn their income via commission, usually from the deal they make with the model and or the head agency.

Modeling agencies

See also
 Lists of companies

References

!
Modeling agencies